Championship Snooker is a Canadian television series which aired on CBC Television from 1966 to 1967.

Premise
Each episode featured snooker games between two players, recorded in Toronto at the House of Champions and edited for the hour-long time slot.

Don Maybee and Bob Trodd were the competitors in the debut episode.

Scheduling

The series was broadcast on Saturday afternoons. The first series featured a 26-week tournament, broadcast between 7 May and 26 November 1966. The second season was broadcast from 13 May to 16 September 1967,

References

External links
 

CBC Television original programming
1966 Canadian television series debuts
1967 Canadian television series endings
1960s Canadian sports television series
Snooker on television